On September 29, 1957, a Karachi-bound express passenger train collided at full speed with a stationary oil-tanker train before midnight, at Gambar Railway Station. 300 people were killed and 150 wounded by the accident.

References

Train collisions in Pakistan
Railway accidents in 1957
1957 in Pakistan
Accidents and incidents involving Pakistan Railways
1957 disasters in Pakistan